Sindap Station is a station on the Seongsu Branch of the Seoul Subway Line 2. It is located in Yongdap-dong, Seongdong-gu, Seoul.

References

Metro stations in Seongdong District
Seoul Metropolitan Subway stations
Railway stations opened in 1980
1980 establishments in South Korea
20th-century architecture in South Korea